The Potowomut River is a tidal extension of the Hunt River in the U.S. state of Rhode Island.

Course
The river begins in name just south of Old Forge Road in Warwick where the river becomes the southern boundary of Potowomut Neck, an exclave of Warwick. It flows roughly northeast between Warwick and North Kingstown until its mouth at Narragansett Bay.

Crossings
Old Forge Road in Warwick is the only crossing over the Potowomut River.

Tributaries
The Potowomut River has no named or unnamed tributaries.

See also
List of rivers in Rhode Island
Hunt River
Narragansett Bay

References

Rivers of Kent County, Rhode Island
East Greenwich, Rhode Island
Warwick, Rhode Island
Rivers of Rhode Island